William Kitchen House is a historic home located at New Hope, Bucks County, Pennsylvania. The house consists of three sections; the oldest built about 1770 and flanked by the second and third sections.  The first and second sections are  stories tall and constructed of stuccoed stone and has a gable roof.  The third section was added in the 20th century and is  stories tall.

It was added to the National Register of Historic Places in 1985.

References

Houses on the National Register of Historic Places in Pennsylvania
Houses in Bucks County, Pennsylvania
National Register of Historic Places in Bucks County, Pennsylvania